Hassan "Iniko" Johnson is an American actor from Brooklyn, New York. He portrayed Roland "Wee-Bey" Brice on HBO's The Wire and also appears as Drew in Flatbush Misdemeanors on Showtime.

Career 
Johnson's first acting role was in the 1995 Spike Lee film Clockers. He also had a significant role in the motion picture In Too Deep, which was based on a true story. He also had a recurring role on ER as Darnell Thibeaux. Johnson has appeared in Brooklyn's Finest, Belly and The Devil's Own.

He owns a production company called Autumn Leaves, which he named after his daughter.

He has also appeared in Mýa's music video for "Fallen", Killarmy's music video "Fair, Love & War", The Roots' music video for "Break You Off", GZA's music video for "Knock Knock",  Boyz n da Hood's "Dem Boyz", Obie Trice's music video for "Snitch", Jadakiss's music video "Time's up", Freeway's "What We Do?" music video alongside his fellow cast-members from The Wire, Jay-Z's music video for "Anything", 50 Cent's music video "Just a Lil Bit", the crime-drama web series "Dead Man's Trigger", and alongside DMX and Nas in the movie Belly. He was Jennifer Hudson's love interest in "No One Gonna Love You" video. Johnson also played a small role in Entourage as rapper Saigon's manager.

Most recently Johnson has appeared as the character Lorenzo on the CBS television show Person of Interest, and as the voice actor for Harold "Stretch" Joseph in the video game Grand Theft Auto V. He appeared in the 2018 WWE Studios film Blood Brother.

Filmography

Film and TV Movies

Television

Video games

References

External links 

Male models from New York (state)
Living people
Film producers from New York (state)
American male film actors
Male actors from New York City
African-American male actors
People from Staten Island
20th-century American male actors
Models from New York City
American producers
21st-century American male actors
African-American male models
African-American models
20th-century African-American people
21st-century African-American people
Year of birth missing (living people)